Lewis and Clark Park, officially known as MercyOne Field at Lewis and Clark Park, is a stadium in Sioux City, Iowa. It is primarily used for baseball and is the home field of the Sioux City Explorers minor league baseball team and the Morningside University baseball team. The ballpark opened in 1993 and has a capacity of 3,800 people.

The park is named for Meriwether Lewis and William Clark, leaders of the Lewis and Clark Expedition of the American West who journeyed across the western frontier of early America from 1804 to 1806.  The expedition's only casualty, Charles Floyd, was lost near present-day Sioux City.

References

Baseball venues in Iowa
Minor league baseball venues
Sioux City, Iowa
Buildings and structures in Sioux City, Iowa
NAIA World Series venues
1993 establishments in Iowa
Sports venues completed in 1993
Morningside Mustangs baseball